Senohrad is a village and municipality in the Krupina District of the Banská Bystrica Region of Slovakia.

References

External links
 
 

Villages and municipalities in Krupina District